The Richtersveld katydid (Africariola longicauda) is a species of katydid that is endemic to the Richtersveld National Park in South Africa. It occurs in semi-arid habitats of the Karoo biotope. It is threatened by livestock grazing and climate change.

References

Tettigoniidae
Endemic insects of South Africa
Vulnerable animals
Vulnerable biota of Africa
Insects described in 1996
Monotypic Orthoptera genera